Clarence Virgil Locke (March 25, 1911 – January 10, 1971), nicknamed "Dad", was an American Negro league pitcher in the 1940s.

A native of Kansas City, Missouri, Locke made his Negro leagues debut in 1945 with the Chicago American Giants. He played four seasons with Chicago through 1948. Locke died in Kansas City, Kansas, on January 10, 1971, at age 59.

References

External links
 and Seamheads

1911 births
1971 deaths
Date of death missing
Chicago American Giants players
Baseball pitchers
Baseball players from Kansas City, Missouri
20th-century African-American sportspeople